Eustathios Argyros can refer to:

 Eustathios Argyros (admiral under Leo VI)
 Eustathios Argyros (general under Leo VI)